Settlers Landing is a station on the RTA Waterfront Line in Cleveland, Ohio. The station is located just south of the intersection of West Superior Avenue and Old River Road.

It is the first station beyond Tower City station on the Waterfront line, which extended the Green and Blue Lines into The Flats along the east bank of the Cuyahoga River and along the Lake Erie waterfront. The station is adjacent to the Settlers Landing historical site which marks the location where Moses Cleaveland and his surveying team disembarked from the Cuyahoga River to survey the city in 1796.

History
The station opened on July 10, 1996, when light rail service was extended 2.2 miles from Tower City through The Flats and along the lakefront. This extension was designated the Waterfront Line, although it is actually an extension of the Blue and Green Lines, as trains leaving this station toward Tower City continue along the Blue or Green Line routes to Shaker Heights.

Station layout

Notable places nearby
 The Flats
 The Warehouse District
 Detroit-Superior Bridge
 Jacobs Pavilion

Artwork
The station includes eight etched glass panels created by local artist Martin Boyle. The panels join to make up windscreens to shield waiting riders at the outdoor station. Each of the panels, which measure 63 inches by 24 or 20 inches, have fine, detailed etchings of ships, canoes, early settlers in covered wagons and local waterways illustrating different local transportation eras. Each image is hand-drawn in a classical etching style and using a crosshatch technique. One illustration is a map of Cleaveland's route to the Cuyahoga.

Gallery

References

External links

Waterfront Line (RTA Rapid Transit)
Railway stations in the United States opened in 1996
Railway stations closed in 2020
1996 establishments in Ohio